Taller is the eighth studio album by British jazz musician Jamie Cullum, released through Island Records on 7 June 2019.

Background
Cullum divulged that the title of the album was a reference to attention toward his height in comparison to that of his wife, Sophie Dahl, quipping that he "managed to completely break one of the laws of the universe by marrying a taller woman and it was quite interesting how much that was talked about".

Release and promotion
During the 2018 Montreux Jazz Festival, Cullum premiered the tracks "Taller" and "Mankind" from the album. The album's title track was made available along with pre-orders of the album in May 2019. Ahead of its release, two additional songs were made available on music streaming services: "Drink" and "The Age of Anxiety" on 8 May and 31 May, respectively.

Cullum announced in May 2019 that he was set to embark on a tour across the United Kingdom to support the album in March 2020. In Dave Simpson's review of Cullum's performance at the York Barbican for The Guardian, he deemed some of Cullum's routines "well-worn" but praised Cullum's versatility as well as his "aplomb".

Critical reception
Awarding the album four stars out of five, Matt Collar of AllMusic regarded Taller as "sophisticated and emotionally unguarded". The album was also chosen as one of the Evening Standards albums of the week on 7 June 2019. Writing for the publication, Andre Paine deemed the album a "bold reinvention". Conversely, Steven Wine of the Associated Press noted that the album was "stylistically scattershot" but that "there’s something for everyone".

Track listing
Track listing and credits adapted from Tidal.

Charts

References

2019 albums
Jamie Cullum albums
Island Records albums